West Stockbridge Grange No. 246 is a historic grange hall at 5 Swamp Road in West Stockbridge, Massachusetts.

The Greek Revival building was constructed in 1838 and added to the National Register of Historic Places in 1999.

This early Grange Hall was originally built as the Methodist Church in the Village of West Stockbridge in 1838.  Located on Swamp Road the property is bordered by the Williams River.  A handsome example of Greek Revival architecture, which still retains its original 36 over 36 sashes with glazed gothic arches, the church closed its doors in 1910.  The building remained vacant for a number of years.

In 1918 the building was purchased by the West Stockbridge/Alford Grange and underwent extensive renovations to the interior making it one of the "best Grange Halls of its day in Western Massachusetts."  These improvements included electricity, wainscoting the walls and vaulted ceiling, the installation of some of the original church pews on sidewall platforms, and the addition of rock maple flooring.  The choir was also enclosed and glazed pocket doors with early stained glass decals were installed.   A dramatic theatrical stage was constructed at the back of the large open meeting room with a spectacular hand-painted theater curtain which remains there today.  The building was dedicated by members of that Grange on August 1, 1919, and the lofty 17’ ceiling, gothic windows, moldings, and wainscoting remain intact from this time period.

This building has been privately owned since 2007 and continues to be a meeting place for the West Stockbridge Grange which still houses their ceremonial artifacts there.  These include a number of podiums, staff, early wind and rain machines, and various other items of historic interest.

Occasionally the current owner has offered the building for use and as a fundraising tool by non-profit organizations.  Amenities include a sound system, digital projector, 14’ x 9’ movie screen, spot-lit mirror ball, dimmable lighting, comfortable upholstered seating, numerous side chairs, and various folding tables.  The building is not officially open to the public, but it is able to be shown by appointment. 413-232-8595

See also
National Register of Historic Places listings in Berkshire County, Massachusetts

References

Clubhouses on the National Register of Historic Places in Massachusetts
Grange organizations and buildings in Massachusetts
Buildings and structures in Berkshire County, Massachusetts
Grange buildings on the National Register of Historic Places
National Register of Historic Places in Berkshire County, Massachusetts
West Stockbridge, Massachusetts